The Last Post is a British television drama series first broadcast in the United Kingdom on BBC One from 1 October  to 5 November 2017. It is set in the backdrop of the Aden Emergency and a unit of the Royal Military Police depicting the conflict and the relationships of the men and their families together and with the local population. In May 2018, it was reported that a second series would not be commissioned.

Production

Conception
Executive producer of Bonafide Films' Margery Bone proposed a story about British Army life on an army base. She approached Peter Moffat who had a military family background. Moffat suggested setting the series in the 1960s at the end of the British Empire with military personnel posted with their wives to a  strategically important place. This gave a way to explore twentieth century British attitudes through a tightly knit group of people.

Location
The producers needed a location similar to Aden with coast, mountains and desert and a colonial architectural influence, settling on Cape Town. A disused British naval base overlooking Simon's Town bay provided a scale which is often difficult to achieve for television.

Cast and characters
Jessie Buckley as Honor Martin
Stephen Campbell Moore as Lieutenant Ed Laithwaite
Amanda Drew as Mary Markham
Ben Miles as Major Harry Markham
Jeremy Neumark Jones as Captain Joe Martin
Jessica Raine as Alison Laithwaite
Ouidad Elma as Yusra Saeed
Chris Reilly as Sergeant Alex Baxter
Tom Glynn-Carney as Lance Corporal Tony Armstrong
Louis Greatorex as Lance Corporal Paul Stoneham
Richard Dillane as Harvey Tillbrook
Kevin Sutton as Corporal Israel Orchover
Essie Davis as Martha Franklin
Toby Woolf as George Markham
Aymen Hamdouchi as Kadir Hakim (Starfish)
Joseph Kennedy as Captain Nick Page

Episode list

References

External links
 
 
 

2017 British television series debuts
2017 British television series endings
2010s British drama television series
2010s British television miniseries
BBC television dramas
English-language television shows
British military television series
Television series set in the 1960s
Television shows filmed in South Africa
Television shows set in Yemen